Michael Bailey (born October 11, 1982) is a former professional Canadian football player with the Toronto Argonauts of the Canadian Football League.

Early years 

In September 2002, he enrolled at Mount Allison University, studying English while playing for both the Mount Allison Mounties football and basketball teams. In 2003, he was named an Atlantic University Sport All-Star and named the Mounties most improved player, recording 36 tackles in 8 games. In 2005, he was selected to compete in the CIS football East West Bowl.

Professional career 
Bailey attended the 2006 CFL Evaluation Camp and, though he went undrafted in the 2006 CFL Draft, his performance was impressive enough that he was signed by the Toronto Argonauts as a free agent on May 12, 2006, and dressed in both pre-season games versus Hamilton as a backup offensive lineman, backup defensive tackle, and played on special teams. He was assigned to the practice roster at the beginning of the regular season, where he remained until he returned for his final season at Mount Allison on July 29.

He re-signed with the Argonauts on January 3, 2007 but released at the end of training camp on June 23, 2007.

References 

1982 births
Canadian football offensive linemen
Living people
Mount Allison Mounties football players
Players of Canadian football from Ontario
Sportspeople from Brampton
Toronto Argonauts players